The 77th Aeronautical Systems Wing (77 ASW) is an inactive United States Air Force unit, last assigned to the Aeronautical Systems Center at Wright-Patterson Air Force Base, Ohio.

Its World War II predecessor unit, the 77th Reconnaissance Group supported ground units in training by flying reconnaissance, artillery adjustment, fighter, and bomber missions, and in the process trained reconnaissance personnel who later served overseas.

History
During World War II the 77th Observation Group supported ground units in training by flying reconnaissance, artillery adjustment, fighter, and bomber missions, and in the process trained reconnaissance personnel who later served overseas. The group's 5th Observation Squadron moved to Desert Center Army Air Field in March 1943, where it supported units training at the Desert Training Center, later relocating to Thermal Army Air Field in September.  It converted entirely to "Grasshopper" aircraft in April 1943, becoming the 5th Liaison Squadron. The 113th Observation Squadron flew antisubmarine patrols over the Gulf of Mexico from March until June 1942 when it was relieved by another squadron (128th). Still another squadron (120th) patrolled the Mexican border from March–July 1942. A detachment of the 77th served in India from February until July 1943. The 77th was inactivated in 1943.

The 77th was redesignated in 1985, though this was a 'paper' change that effectively went no further than an Air Staff filing cabinet. It was then consolidated with the 2852nd Air Base Wing in 1994 to provide services and support for McClellan AFB with its satellite installations and the Sacramento Air Logistics Center with its tenant organizations (the 2852nd had been performing this duty since 1 August 1953) until the base was officially closed in 2001.

The 77th Aeronautical Systems Group moved from Brooks City-Base, San Antonio to Wright-Patterson AFB in mid-2009. It was inactivated on 30 June 2010 along with all aeronautical systems wings when the Aeronautical Systems Center was reorganized.

Units
The 77 ASW supported the Aeronautical Systems Center. Its units perform a variety of missions

 Human Systems Group
 Provided advanced performance, survival, and force protection capabilities to U.S. and allied air, ground, and naval forces through development, production, and sustainment of human-centered systems including aircrew life support, egress, survival, aeromedical equipment, medical information, aerovac equipment testing/certification, AF uniforms, and aircraft mishap analysis.

 Simulator Systems Group
 Responsible for the development, production, test, integration, deployment, modification, and sustainment of common training solutions for joint ground-based training and mission rehearsal systems.

 Aging Aircraft Systems Squadron
 Developed and fielded products that enhance the Air Force's aircraft fleet availability and mission capability while reducing total ownership cost. The squadron is responsible for the development, acquisition, and fielding of cross-enterprise materiel solutions that enhance fleet availability and mission capability.

 Propulsion Systems Squadron
 Responsible for the development, production, test, and fielding of propulsion systems for the Joint Strike Fighter, F/A-22, and C-17. It also manages the Component Improvement Program, critical sustaining engineering for Air Force propulsion, and modernization of all Air Force propulsion systems, future propulsion capabilities, and allied F-15/F-16 engines.

 Combat Electronics Systems Squadron
 Responsible for the development, testing, acquiring, fielding and sustainment of materiel capabilities for multiple Department of Defense and allied aircraft weapon systems.

Lineage, assignments

Lineage
 Established as 77th Observation Group on 5 February 1942
 Activated on 2 March 1942
 Redesignated: 77th Reconnaissance Group on 2 April 1943
 Redesignated: 77th Tactical Reconnaissance Group on 11 August 1943
 Disestablished on 30 November 1943
 Reestablished, and redesignated 77th Tactical Intelligence Wing, on 31 July 1985 (remained inactive)
 Consolidated (16 September 1994) with 2852d Air Base Wing, which was established, and organized, on 1 August 1953.
 Redesignated: 2852d Air Base Group on 16 October 1964
 Redesignated: 652d Support Group on 1 October 1992
 Redesignated: 652d Air Base Group on 1 October 1993
 Redesignated: 77th Air Base Wing on 1 October 1994
 Inactivated on 13 July 2001
 Consolidated (23 June 2006) with Agile Combat Support Systems Wing, which was established on 23 November 2004
 Activated on 18 January 2005
 Redesignated: 77th Aeronautical Systems Wing on 14 July 2006
 Inactivated on 30 June 2010.

Assignments

 Air Force Combat Command, 2 March 1942
 2 Air Support Command, 12 March 1942
 III Ground Air Support Command, 24 May 1942
 2 Air Force, 21 August 1942
 II Ground Air Support Command, 7 September 1942
 Attached to III Ground Air [later, III Air] Support Command, 7 September 1942 – 5 August 1943

 III Air Support (later, III Reconnaissance) Command, 6 August – 30 November 1943
 Sacramento Air Materiel Area (later, Sacramento Air Logistics Center), 1 August 1953 – 13 July 2001
 Aeronautical Systems Center, 18 January 2005 – 30 June 2010

Components
 5th Observation Squadron: 25 January – 2 April 1943
 27th Observation Squadron (later, 27th Reconnaissance Squadron, 27th Tactical Reconnaissance Squadron): 17 July 1942 – 30 November 1943
 35th Photographic Reconnaissance Squadron: 11 August – 30 November 1943 (detached 11 August – 31 October 1943)
 113th Observation Squadron (later, 113th Reconnaissance Squadron; 113th Tactical Reconnaissance Squadron): 12 March 1942 – 30 November 1943
 120th Observation Squadron (later, 120th Reconnaissance Squadron; 120 Tactical Reconnaissance Squadron): 12 March 1942 – 30 November 1943
 125th Observation Squadron (later, 125th Liaison Squadron): 12 March 1942 – 11 August 1943
 128th Observation Squadron (later, 21st Antisubmarine Squadron): 12 March 1942 – 8 March 1943 (detached 3 July – 7 September 1942 and 15 October 1942 – 3 March 1943).

Stations

 Salinas Army Air Base, California, 2 March 1942
 Brownwood Army Airfield, Texas, c. 22 March 1942
 DeRidder Army Airbase, Louisiana, 25 July 1942
 Alamo Field, Texas, 28 September 1942
 Abilene Army Airfield, Texas, 6 April 1943

 Esler Army Airfield, Louisiana, 13 September 1943
 Birmingham Army Airfield, Alabama, 14 – 30 November 1943
 McClellan AFB, California, 1 August 1953 – 13 July 2001
 Wright-Patterson AFB, Ohio, 18 January 2005 – 30 June 2010

Aircraft

O-38 (1942–1943)
O-47 (1942–1943)
O-52 Owl (1942–1943)
L-5 Sentinel (1942–1943)
O-46 (1942)
Douglas O-43 (1942)
A-18 (1942)
L-1 Vigilant (1942–1943)

L-4 (1942–1943)
L-3 (1942–1943)
L-6 (1942–1943)
B-18 Bolo (1942–1943)
O-49 Vigilant (1942)
P-39 Airacobra (1942–1943)
B-25 Mitchell (1943)
A-20 Havoc (1943)

References

Notes

Bibliography 

Wright-Patt AFB Home Page

Wright-Patterson Air Force Base
0077
1942 establishments in California
2010 disestablishments in Ohio